Pushcha-Vodytsia Forest also known Pushcha-Vodytsia Forest-Park, Pushcha-Vodytsia Forestry is a woodland located in the north of Kyiv city between Kyiv–Kovel Highway, Great Ring Road and vulytsia Bohatyrska (Bogatyr Street). The territory of forest belong to the communal company "Sviatoshyske Forestry". 

Forest floral composition consists of mixed type with predominant sections of dense pine forest.

In 2005 parts of the forest was turned into a forest preserve of local significance.

See also
 Pushcha-Vodytsia

References

External links
 Pushcha-Vodytsia Forest in the WWW Encyclopedia of Kiev (WEK)
 In Pushcha-Vodytsia they are destroying forest? (У Пущі-Водиці винищують ліс?). Kyiv (Ukrayinska Pravda). 19 December 2011.

Urban forests of Ukraine
Obolonskyi District
Geography of Kyiv